Georg Wurth (born 1972 in Remscheid) is a German lobbyist and activist.

See also 
 2022 German cannabis legalization framework
 Cannabis in Germany

References

External links

hanfverband.de

German lobbyists
German cannabis activists
1972 births
Living people
People from Remscheid